Norpipah binti Abdol (27 July 1954 – 15 March 2022) was a Malaysian politician.

Biography 
Norpipah served as Member of the Melaka State Executive Council (EXCO) from March 2008 to May 2013 and deputy EXCO from May 2013 to May 2018. She was also Member of the Melaka State Legislative Assembly (MLA) for Rembia from March 2008 to May 2018. She was a member of the United Malays National Organisation (UMNO), a component party of the Barisan Nasional (BN) coalition and also the Alor Gajah UMNO Woman chief.

On 15 March 2022, she died of cancer and tested positive for COVID-19 amid the COVID-19 pandemic in Malaysia.

Election results 
{| class="wikitable" style="margin:0.5em ; font-size:95%"
|+ Malacca State Legislative Assembly   
!|Year
!|Constituency
!colspan=2|Candidate
!|Votes
!|Pct
!colspan=2|Opponent(s)
!|Votes
!|Pct
!|Ballots cast
!|Majority
!|Turnout
|-
|2008
|rowspan=4|N06 Rembia
| | 
| Norpipah Abdol (UMNO) 
|  align="right"| 5,605	
|  66.98%| |
|Md Yusof Abdullah (PKR)
|align="right" | 2,763
| 33.02%
| 8,613
| 2,842
| 78.69%
|-
|2013
| | 
| Norpipah Abdol (UMNO) 
|  align="right"| 6,879	
|  60.34%| |
|Rusnah Aluai (PKR)
|align="right" | 4,521
| 39.66%
| 11,617
| 2,358
| 86.80%
|-
| rowspan=2|2018
| rowspan=2  | 
| rowspan=2|Norpipah Abdol  (UMNO) 
| rowspan=2 align="right"| 4,959	
| rowspan=2| 38.35%
| |
| Muhammad Jailani Khamis (PKR)
|align="right" | 6,773| 52.37%| rowspan=2| 13,175 
| rowspan=2| 1,814
| rowspan=2| 84.26%
|-
| |
|Mohammad Rashidi Abd Razak (PAS)
|align="right" | 1,200
| align=right|9.28%
|}

 Honours 
  :
  Knight Commander of the Exalted Order of Malacca (DCSM) – Datuk Wira''' (2016)

References

1954 births
2022 deaths
Malaysian people of Malay descent
Malaysian Muslims
United Malays National Organisation politicians
Members of the Malacca State Legislative Assembly
Women MLAs in Malacca
Malacca state executive councillors
Deaths from cancer in Malaysia
Deaths from the COVID-19 pandemic in Malaysia
21st-century Malaysian politicians
21st-century Malaysian women politicians